Scott Martin (born 6 November 1981) is a British rallying co-driver who competes in the FIA World Rally Championship.

Biography
Martin began his rallying career in 2001 co-driving at a national level in the UK. With Matthew Wilson in 2004, he finished as second outright co-driver in the British Rally Championship (BRC) in the Ford Focus RS. After the 2004 season, Martin was accepted into the MSA British Rally Elite Scheme, a specialist training scheme for young British rally drivers. 

In 2005 he was involved in a serious accident on the opening round of the BRC, the Rally of Wales, and was airlifted to hospital. Later that year he achieved his first international win on the Trackrod Rally with Wilson. The team also finished first on the Colin McRae Stages Rally.

In 2006 Martin, with Scottish driver Barry Clark in the Ford Fiesta ST, scored third place in the Fiesta Sporting Trophy International (FSTi) series and third place in the S1600 category of the BRC. The following year he achieved his first win in an international series in the FSTi with Clark, and with Mark Higgins he was placed overall third in the FIA Production World Rally Championship.

Throughout the period 2008-2011 he co-drove with Matthew Wilson in the Ford Focus RS (2008-10) and Ford Fiesta RS (2011), competing in the full WRC series. The pair achieved seventh place in the overall classification in 2009 and again in 2011, when they were placed fourth in the Repco Rally Australia, his best WRC result.

He participated in only two WRC events in 2012, then in 2013 competed as co-driver with Sheikh Khalid Al-Qassimi in the Citroen DS3. The team took part in 7 WRC events, and in five Middle East Rally Championship (MERC) events, in which they were placed second overall.

At the end of 2013 Martin had competed in 82 WRC rallies. He stood 13th in the IRDA (International Rally Drivers Association) ranking of co-drivers, with 2844 points, making him the highest-placed British co-driver. In 2014 he and Craig Breen won the Acropolis Rally in Greece - removed that year from the list of FIA championships – driving the Peugeot 208 T16, and the Ravens Rock Rally in Ireland driving the Ford Fiesta RS.

In 2019, Martin co-drove Elfyn Evans with M-Sport World Rally Team with which they get to the podium two time at the third place. He follows him in 2020 to the Toyota team and wins his first WRC rally in Sweden.

WRC victories

Results

WRC results

* Season still in progress.

References

External links

  
 Scott Martin's e-wrc profile

1981 births
Living people
British rally co-drivers
World Rally Championship co-drivers